CFXX-FM is a First Nations community radio station which operates at 104.7 MHz (FM) in Siksika, Alberta, Canada.

History
On June 15, 2001, Dale Hinves, on behalf of a society to be incorporated received approval from the Canadian Radio-television and Telecommunications Commission (CRTC) to operate a new Type B English and native-language FM radio station at Siksika. The station, which took the call sign CHDH-FM, would operate at 103.1 MHz. On the licence renewal in 2007, CHDH-FM's frequency was listed as 97.7 MHz.

In 2012, the station became CFXX-FM at 104.7 MHz.

The station is currently owned by Siksika Communications.

References

External links
  

FXX
Year of establishment missing